In mathematics, and especially gauge theory, Seiberg–Witten invariants are invariants of compact smooth oriented 4-manifolds introduced by , using the Seiberg–Witten theory studied by  during their investigations of Seiberg–Witten gauge theory.

Seiberg–Witten invariants are similar to Donaldson invariants and can be used to prove similar (but sometimes slightly stronger) results about smooth 4-manifolds. They are technically much easier to work with than Donaldson invariants; for example, the moduli spaces of solutions of the Seiberg–Witten equations tends to be compact, so one avoids the hard problems involved in compactifying the moduli spaces in Donaldson theory.

For the relation to symplectic manifolds and Gromov–Witten invariants see . For the early history see .

Spinc-structures
The Spinc group (in dimension 4) is

where the  acts as a sign on both factors. The group has a natural homomorphism to SO(4) = Spin(4)/±1.

Given a compact oriented 4 manifold, choose a smooth Riemannian metric  with Levi Civita connection . This reduces the structure group from the connected component GL(4)+ to SO(4) and is harmless from a homotopical point of view. A Spinc-structure or complex spin structure on M is a reduction of the structure group to Spinc, i.e. a lift of the SO(4) structure on the tangent bundle to the group Spinc. By a theorem of Hirzebruch and Hopf, every smooth oriented compact 4-manifold  admits a Spinc structure. The existence of a Spinc structure is equivalent to the existence of a lift of the second Stiefel–Whitney class  to a class  Conversely such a lift determines the Spinc structure up to 2 torsion in  A spin structure proper requires the more restrictive 

A Spinc structure determines (and is determined by) a spinor bundle  coming from the 2 complex dimensional positive and negative spinor representation of Spin(4) on which U(1) acts by multiplication. We have . There is a unique hermitian metric  on  s.t.  is skew Hermitian for real 1 forms . It gives an induced action of the forms  by anti-symmetrising.

Seiberg–Witten equations

The gauge group  acts on the space of solutions. For technical reasons, the equations are in fact defined in suitable Sobolev spaces of sufficiently high regularity.

An application of the Weitzenböck formula

and the identity

to solutions of the equations gives an equality

.

After adding the gauge fixing condition, elliptic regularity of the Dirac equation shows that solutions  are in fact a priori bounded in Sobolev norms of arbitrary regularity, which shows all solutions are smooth, and that the space of all solutions up to gauge equivalence is compact.

The solutions  of the Seiberg–Witten equations are called monopoles, as these equations are the field equations of massless magnetic monopoles on the manifold .

The moduli space of solutions
The space of solutions is acted on by the gauge group, and the quotient by this action is called the moduli space of monopoles.

The moduli space is usually a manifold. For generic metrics, after gauge fixing, the equations cut out the solution space transversely and so define a smooth manifold. By the Atiyah–Singer index theorem the moduli space is finite dimensional and has "virtual dimension"

 

which for generic metrics is the actual dimension away from the reducibles. It means that the moduli space is generically empty if the virtual dimension is negative.

For a self dual 2 form , the reducible solutions have , and so are determined by connections  on  such that  for some anti selfdual 2-form . Thus, since the  the necessary and sufficient condition for a reducible solution is 

 

where  is the space of harmonic anti-selfdual 2-forms. A two form  is -admissible if this condition is not met and solutions are necessarily irreducible. Note that, if  the space of -admissible two forms is connected, whereas if  it has two connected components (chambers). The moduli space can be given a natural orientation from an orientation on the space of positive harmonic 2 forms, and the first cohomology.

There are therefore (for fixed ) only finitely many , and hence only finitely many Spinc structures, with a non empty moduli space.

Seiberg–Witten invariants
The Seiberg–Witten invariant of a four-manifold M with b2+(M) ≥ 2 is a map from the spinc structures on M to Z. The value of the invariant on a spinc structure is easiest to define when the moduli space is zero-dimensional (for a generic metric). In this case the value is the number of elements of the moduli space counted with signs.

The Seiberg–Witten invariant can also be defined when b2+(M) = 1, but then it depends on the choice of a chamber.

A manifold M is said to be of simple type if the Seiberg–Witten invariant vanishes whenever the expected dimension of the moduli space is nonzero. The simple type conjecture states that if M is simply connected and b2+(M) ≥ 2 then the manifold is of simple type. This is true for symplectic manifolds.

If the manifold M has a metric of positive scalar curvature and b2+(M) ≥ 2 then all Seiberg–Witten invariants of M vanish.

If the manifold M is the connected sum of two manifolds both of which have  b2+ ≥ 1 then all Seiberg–Witten invariants of M vanish.

If the manifold M is simply connected and symplectic and b2+(M) ≥ 2 then it has a spinc structure s on which the Seiberg–Witten invariant is 1. In particular it cannot be split as a connected sum of manifolds with b2+ ≥ 1.

References

 .
; 

4-manifolds
Partial differential equations